Christ Church Riverdale is a historic Episcopal parish church and related structures at 5040 Henry Hudson Parkway East in Riverdale, Bronx, New York City.

The church was founded in 1866 and its building, made from brick and local stone with a simple pierced-wall belfry; the church building was built in 1866 to designs by architect Richard M. Upjohn. It  was added to the National Register of Historic Places in 1983. The building underwent exterior restoration in 1991 and 1992, and it was designated as a New York City landmark.

Rev. Gustav Cartensen was Rector until 1919. He was the first to permit attendance of black children from a nearby "Negro orphan asylum".   He was then invited to take the pulpit at Holyrood Episcopal Church. His "liberal" positions garnered "widespread publicity," according to The New York Times.
Members of Christ Church today are drawn to the congregation's vibrant diversity, with people who have come together from many different countries and many faith traditions to form a warm and supportive community. Fr. Andrew G. Butler III is since 2014 the Rector of Christ Church Riverdale, after serving parishes in New Jersey, Pennsylvania, and Virginia.

Funeral of Lou Gehrig
In June 1941 the church was the site of the funeral of former New York Yankee baseball player Lou Gehrig, whose home was nearby.

References

External links

Christ Church Riverdale's web site

Richard Michell Upjohn church buildings
Episcopal church buildings in the Bronx
Properties of religious function on the National Register of Historic Places in the Bronx
Second Empire architecture in New York City
Gothic Revival church buildings in New York City
Churches completed in 1866
19th-century Episcopal church buildings
1866 establishments in New York (state)
New York City Designated Landmarks in the Bronx